The Women's 500m Time Trial was one of the 6 women's events at the 2003 UCI Track Cycling World Championships, held in Melbourne, Australia.

20 Cyclists from 17 countries were due to participate in the race, Evgenia Radanova of Bulgaria did not start. The Final was held on July 31 at 19:15.

World record

Final

References

Women's 500 m time trial
UCI Track Cycling World Championships – Women's 500 m time trial